Haldipur  is a village in Honnavar Taluk in Uttara Kannada District in the southern state of Karnataka, India. It is located in the Honavar taluk of Uttara Kannada district in Karnataka.
A sea port is under construction.

Demographics
 India census, Haldipur had a population of 10,132 with 5,053 males and 5,079 females.

See also
 Districts of Karnataka

References

External links
 

Villages in Uttara Kannada district